Joseph Maclay may refer to:
 Joseph Paton Maclay, 1st Baron Maclay, Scottish businessman and public servant
 Joseph Maclay, 2nd Baron Maclay, Scottish banker, shipowner, peer and politician